The Villa Elisa Historic Train (in Spanish: Tren Histórico de Villa Elisa) is a heritage railway of Entre Ríos Province in Argentina. Trains run on  gauge tracks originally built by British-owned Entre Ríos Railway and currently part of General Urquiza Railway since the nationalisation of the network in 1948.

The service operates on weekends only to Primero de Mayo (4 km length), extending its route during the winter holidays to Caseros and San José palace.

History 
On July 21, 1907, the Entre Ríos Railway opened the 36-km line between Villa Elisa and Caseros. After the entire railway network was nationalised in 1948, Ferrocarriles Argentinos took over the line but the lack of maintenance and a decreasing number of passengers carried resulted in the closure of the line in July 1980.

In the 1990s and after the Carlos Menem's administration ended all the long-distance services in Argentina (with a few exceptions), a group of enthusiasts decided to reopen the line, bringing an old 1928 Scottish steam locomotive that had been abandoned in Concepción del Uruguay. After the machine was restored, two coaches originally used by the ERR were added to the train.

The service was inaugurated and operated since then by "Ferroclub Central Entrerriano", a local non-profit association formed by railway enthusiasts. The service was later extended to Caseros, with a total journey time of 120 minutes.

The service has been interrupted and restarted several times, the last in 2013.

It crosses several tourist points of the province such as 1 de Mayo, Pronuciamiento and Caseros. From then on, the route is completed by bus to San José palace, the former personal residence of Justo José de Urquiza, Argentine caudillo, general, politician and President of the Argentine Confederation from 1854 to 1860.

References

External links 
 Tren histórico on Turismo Entre Ríos
 Salidas del tren histórico on Municipalidad de Villa Elisa
 Tren Histórico on Villa Elisa Turismo (archived, 2 Jan 2017)
 

Railway lines in Argentina
Tourist attractions in Argentina
Heritage railways in Argentina
Transport in Entre Ríos Province